John Burns was a Scottish professional footballer who played as a centre half. Brown signed for Dundee Hibernian in November 1911 and despite being a regular, left the club in April 1912 after playing a dozen league matches. It is unknown where he went after this.

References

Dundee United F.C. players
Scottish footballers
Year of birth unknown
Year of death unknown
Place of death missing
Association football central defenders